73rd Heavy Anti-Aircraft Regiment may refer to:

 73rd Heavy Anti-Aircraft Regiment, Royal Artillery, a British Territorial Army unit formed in the West Midlands in 1937
 73rd Heavy Anti-Aircraft Regiment (1947–55), a Regular British Army unit